Clásicos Torrealberos, is an album by Venezuelan harpist Juan Vicente Torrealba, where he presents classic songs of his repertoire.

Track listing 

Side A

Concierto En La LLanura
Rapsodia Llanera
Primaveral
Estero De Camaguán
Sol Llanero
Araguaney

Side B

Sinfonía Del Palmar
Cuatro Corazones
Sueños Del Gamelotal
Eres Tú
Tempestad En El Palmar
El Tranquero

 All tracks by Juan Vicente Torrealba.

Juan Vicente Torrealba albums